is a Japanese former professional cyclist.

Major results
1999
1st  Road race, National Under-23 Road Championships
2000
1st  Road race, National Under-23 Road Championships
3rd Tour de Okinawa
2004
1st Shimano Suzuka Road race
2005
1st Shimano Suzuka Road race
2008
1st Stage 8a Tour de la Martinique

External links

1978 births
Living people
Japanese male cyclists
People from Fujisawa, Kanagawa
Sportspeople from Kanagawa Prefecture